The Conference USA women's basketball tournament is held annually following the end of the regular season of NCAA Division I Women's Basketball.

The tournament has been played every year since the inception of Conference USA in 1996.  The winner receives an automatic berth into the NCAA Division I women's basketball tournament.

Tournament Champions

Tournament Championships by School

Current members
Members as of July 1, 2022.

Former members
Former members that have won the tournament as of July 1, 2022.

See also
Conference USA men's basketball tournament

References
Conference USA official website